
The following lists events that happened during 1852 in South Africa.

Events

January
 17 January – The South African Republic is established with the signing of the Sand River Convention

February
 26 February – The British troopship,  is wrecked near Gansbaai, Western Cape

March
 16 March – Voortrekker leaders, Andries Pretorius and Hendrik Potgieter reconcile

Unknown date
 Copper mining begins at Springbokfontein

Deaths
 25 June – Ludwig Heinrich Beil, musician and botanist, dies in Keurbooms River near Plettenberg Bay
 16 December – Hendrik Potgieter,  (59), Voortrekker leader, dies in Zoutpansbergdorp

References
See Years in South Africa for list of References

Years in South Africa